Jallouli Fares (6 March 1909 – 28 October 2001) was a politician in Tunisia during its transitions from French colony to monarchy to republic. He was Minister of Education in 1955-56, then Speaker of the Constituent Assembly until 1959, then Speaker of the National Assembly until 1964.

Fares presided over the Constituent Assembly on 25 July 1957 when it announced the abolition of the Tunisian monarchy and the beginning of a republic.

References 

1909 births
Neo Destour politicians
Government ministers of Tunisia
Presidents of the Chamber of Deputies (Tunisia)
2001 deaths